Baeza is a city and municipality of Spain belonging to the province of Jaén, in the autonomous community of Andalusia. It is part of the comarca of La Loma.

It is now principally famed for having some of the best-preserved examples of Italian Renaissance architecture in Spain. Along with neighbouring Úbeda, it was added to UNESCO's list of World Heritage Sites in 2003. The former Visigothic bishopric of Baeza remains a Latin Catholic titular see.

Geography 
The town lies perched on a cliff in the range (the ) separating the Guadalquivir River to its south from the Guadalimar to its north.

History 
Under the Romans, the town was known as 'Beatia'. Following its conquest by the Visigoths, Beatia was the seat of a bishopric of Baeza (viz.). From the beginning of the seventh century it was conquered by several Arab and berber states during the Al-Andalus period, being named Bayyasa.
 
The Christian diocese was reestablished in 1127 or 1147 following the town's conquest by Alfonso VII of Castile, but it was then again reconquered by the Almohads. After the Battle of Las Navas de Tolosa, Ferdinand III of Castile in 1227 retook the city and gave it the Fuero de Cuenca, a legislative body, to facilitate the new Castilian order and institutions.

For the rest of the middle ages, Baeza remained together with Jaén, Úbeda and Andújar among the dominant cities in the Kingdom of Jaén, although the 1248 conquest of Jaén tended to favour the fortunes of that city, that enjoyed a strategic location vis-à-vis the Kingdom of Granada.

The most important crops were those of cereal, complemented by the likes of grapevines, olive, and almond. Olive crops, far from the current-day olive monoculture, suffered from the mid-fifteenth century onward due to the cultivation of sumac.

The diocese of Baeza was merged with Jaén in 1248 or 1249, but was later nominally restored as a titular see of the Roman Catholic Church. With it, a University was founded as well, which shaped the cultural personality of the city over the following centuries.  Also, two powerful families, Benavides and Carvajales, competed for power and determined the historical evolution of the city, which required the intervention of Isabel I of Castile at the end of the fifteenth century.

By the early 16th century, the jurisdiction of Baeza extended beyond the city proper to the hamlets of Begíjar, Lupión, Ibros, Rus, Vílchez, Bailén, Baños, Linares and Castro.

The sixteenth century was the golden era of Baeza (and nearby Úbeda). It grew rich from several industries, notably textiles, and the noble families, which were well connected with the Spanish Imperial state. They hired major architects of the era (including Andrés de Vandelvira) to design the present cathedral, churches, public buildings, and private palaces in the then-fashionable Italian style. The town's university building dates to 1533. The city declined in importance in the seventeenth century, with the only remaining industry consisting of local production of grain and olive oil. As few newer structures were built during this period, this had the effect of preserving the town's Renaissance legacy. The university closed for a time before being reopened by the nineteenth century as a seminary. In the 1870s, the population was around 11,000; over the next few decades, the Linares–Almeria railway was constructed nearby and town's population grew to 14,000 by 1900.

Landmarks 

Baeza still houses several fine public buildings:
Natividad de Nuestra Señora Cathedral, presents an early Gothic and Plateresque pilasters and crossed vaults finished in the sixteenth century in a Renaissance style by renamed architect Andrés de Vandelvira, and since 1584 by architect and mathematician Juan Bautista Villalpando. The tower was redone in 1549 and the Chapel of St Michael was added in 1560.
 Town Hall, a Plateresque building originally built as a combined courthouse and prison, leading to two separate main entrances
Baeza University, established in 1533 or 1538, now a secondary school
Santa Cruz Church, a Romanesque church with a two-aisle nave and semicircular apse. A side wall incorporates a Visigothic arch.
St Paul's Church, a Gothic church with a Renaissance portal with a two-aisle nave and Gothic chapels. Includes the tomb of Pablo de Olavide.
The Chapel of St Francis, in the ruins of a Renaissance building from 1538 formerly used as a monastery
Jabalquinto Palace, including an Gothic entrance flanked by two cylindrical pilasters with Plateresque capitals with mocárabes ornamentation, a Renaissance courtyard, and a Baroque staircase
Spain Plaza
Constitution Plaza ( or ), including a marble fountain decorated with Caryatides
St Mary Fountain (1564)
The Fountain of the Lions, from the Ibero-Roman ruins of Cástulo and possibly representing Himilce, wife of the Carthaginian general Hannibal
 The Úbeda Gate and Jaén Gate.
 The Villalar Arch, erected for Charles V's 1526 visit to honor his 1521 victory at Villalar.
Seminary oratorio of St Philip Neri (1660)

Transport 
There are bus connections to Granada, Málaga, and Madrid. Granada and Málaga are the nearest international airports.

Notable locals 
 Saro, bishop
 Domingo, bishop (1236–1249), Dominican friar, and former bishop of Marocco from 27 October 1225 – 1236
 Gaspar Becerra, sculptor and painter
 St John of Ávila, Christian mystic
 St John of the Cross, Christian mystic
 Pablo de Olavide
 Antonio Machado, modernist poet whose most notable prose work Juan de Mairena is thought to have been inspired by his time as a teacher in Baeza (1912–1919)
Ginés Martin de Aranda, designer of the Fountain of Mary in the square of Baeza. He also contributed to some of the works of the Cathedral of Baeza.

International relations 

Baeza is twinned with:
 Carcassonne, France

Gallery

See also 
 Roman Catholic Diocese of Baeza

References 
Notes

Citations

Sources and external links 

 Official site for the municipal government
 
 Ubeda and Baeza site
 
 
 Romanesque church at Baeza
 Image Gallery of Baeza
 Baeza eGuide
 ebaeza.com eBaeza guide

Bibliography 
 
 
 

 
Municipalities in the Province of Jaén (Spain)
World Heritage Sites in Spain